Haverford is an unincorporated community located in both Haverford Township in Delaware County, Pennsylvania, United States, and Lower Merion Township in Montgomery County, approximately  west of Philadelphia. The Pennsylvania Railroad (PRR) opened Haverford Station in 1880 on their Main Line west out of Broad Street Station (now Suburban Station) in Philadelphia. Haverford sits at milepost 9.17.

Haverford borders the unincorporated portion of Haverford Township called "Havertown," as well as the unincorporated communities of Bryn Mawr, Gladwyne, Ardmore, Wynnewood, and a small portion of Broomall.

Haverford's name is derived from the name of the town of Haverfordwest in Wales, UK.

Today, Haverford is most notable for being the site of Haverford College and one of the United States' oldest country clubs, the Merion Cricket Club.

Major roads in Haverford include Lancaster Avenue (US 30/Lincoln Highway), Montgomery Avenue, Haverford Road, and I-476 (Blue Route).

Demographics
As of August 2009, the average home price in the Haverford ZIP Code 19041 was $849,000.

Infrastructure

Public Transportation
Haverford - Paoli/Thorndale Line
Haverford - Norristown High Speed Line
Suburban Bus Routes: 105 (Rosemont to 69th Street) and 106 (Paoli to 69th Street)

Historic Sites

Notable people
David J. Adelman (born 1974), CEO of Campus Apartments and the co-founder and chairman of FS Investments
 John C. Bogle (1929–2019), financial guru, founder of The Vanguard Group of mutual funds. He was the author of several books, including "The Little Book of Common Sense Investing" (John Wiley, 2007). In 1999, Fortune magazine named Bogle as one of the four "Investment Giants" of the twentieth century. In 2004, Time magazine named Bogle as one of the world's 100 most powerful and influential people. He was a former resident of North Rose Lane.
 Catherine Drinker Bowen (1897–1973) author and historian. She was the author of many books including "Miracle at Philadelphia: The Story of the Constitutional Convention, May to September 1787" and "The Most Dangerous Man in America: Scenes from the Life of Benjamin Franklin" (1974). She lived on Booth Lane, north of Montgomery Avenue
 Alexander Johnson ("AJ") Cassatt (1839–1906), president of the Pennsylvania Railroad from 1899 to 1906. His estate, "Cheswold," was off of Grays Lane. A bas-relief plaque showing Cassatt on horseback is located on the stone wall of the Merion Cricket Club, at the corner of Grays Lane and Montgomery Avenue. Cassatt, the brother of the American impressionist painter Mary Cassatt, was responsible for the granite curbstones which give so many roads in Lower Merion Township such charm. He also designed the distinctive green and yellow metal street signs which characterize the township.
 Herb Clarke (1927–2012), former weatherman for WCAU-TV from 1958 to 1997
 Frank Converse (born 1938), actor, former resident of Laurel Lane.
 Theodore Freeman, aeronautical engineer, U.S. Air Force officer, test pilot, and NASA astronaut
 Clement Acton Griscom, founder and president of American Steamship Lines. His estate, "Dolobran," is on Laurel Lane. The house was designed by the famous Philadelphia architect Frank Furness, who also designed the Merion Cricket Club in Haverford. (O'Loughlin, Kathy, "Frank H. Furness: Visionary architect," Main Line Times, August 19, 2010. See also Lower Merion Historical Society, "The First 300 Years: An Amazing and Rich History of Lower Merion Township.")
 Ken Henderson, former Major League Baseball player.
 Joshua Humphreys (born June 17, 1751, Haverford Township, Pa., U.S.—died Jan. 12, 1838, Haverford, Pa.), American shipbuilder and naval architect who designed the U.S. frigate Constitution, familiarly known as “Old Ironsides” (launched Oct. 21, 1797). Humphreys was commissioned in 1794 to design six frigates for the newly formed U.S. Navy, thus becoming the first American naval construction contractor.
 John LeClair, retired National Hockey League All-Star
 Frederic Lewy, German-born neurologist, discovered Lewy bodies
 Jameer Nelson, All-Star basketball player for the Orlando Magic. A native of Chester, Pennsylvania, he attended St. Joseph's University. He lives in Haverford during the off season (Philadelphia Magazine, "Best of Philly" issue, August 2010, page 134)
 Georges Perrier, chef, founder of Le Bec-Fin restaurant in Philadelphia. He lived on Booth Lane.
 J. Howard Pew, son of Joseph Newton Pew, the founder of Sun Oil Company. His estate, "Knollbrook," was at Grays Lane and Mill Creek Road.
 Dave Roberts, retired weather forecaster for WPVI-TV Action News
 Karin Katherine Taylor, actress, fashion model, Playmate of the Month in Playboy magazine (June 1996). She founded Style House in Haverford. She is currently living in Palm Beach, Florida.
 Christopher Morley (1890--1957), poet, essayist, and novelist was born in Haverford and attended Haverford College ( The Writer's Almanac, 5-5-2021).  He was one of the founders of The Saturday Review of Literature.  He was a notable fan of Sherlock Holmes and founded the invitation-only Sherlockian honor society The Baker Street Irregulars in 1934.

See also

Haverford Township, Delaware County, Pennsylvania
Haverford College
The Haverford School
Friends School Haverford

References

External links 

 Lower Merion Township Website
 Haverford Township Website

Philadelphia Main Line
Lower Merion Township, Pennsylvania
Haverford Township, Pennsylvania
Unincorporated communities in Montgomery County, Pennsylvania
Unincorporated communities in Delaware County, Pennsylvania
Unincorporated communities in Pennsylvania